In mathematics, the theory of optimal stopping or early stopping is concerned with the problem of choosing a time to take a particular action, in order to maximise an expected reward or minimise an expected cost. Optimal stopping problems can be found in areas of statistics, economics, and mathematical finance (related to the pricing of American options). A key example of an optimal stopping problem is the secretary problem. Optimal stopping problems can often be written in the form of a Bellman equation, and are therefore often solved using dynamic programming.

Definition

Discrete time case 
Stopping rule problems are associated with two objects:
 A sequence of random variables , whose joint distribution is something assumed to be known
 A sequence of 'reward' functions  which depend on the observed values of the random variables in 1:
 

Given those objects, the problem is as follows:
 You are observing the sequence of random variables, and at each step , you can choose to either stop observing or continue
 If you stop observing at step , you will receive reward 
 You want to choose a stopping rule to maximize your expected reward (or equivalently, minimize your expected loss)

Continuous time case 
Consider a gain process  defined on a filtered probability space  and assume that  is adapted to the filtration. The optimal stopping problem is to find the stopping time  which maximizes the expected gain
 
where  is called the value function. Here  can take value .

A more specific formulation is as follows.
 
This is sometimes called the MLS (which stand for Mayer, Lagrange, and supremum, respectively) formulation.

Solution methods 
There are generally two approaches to solving optimal stopping problems. When the underlying process (or the gain process) is described by its unconditional finite-dimensional distributions, the appropriate solution technique is the martingale approach, so called because it uses martingale theory, the most important concept being the Snell envelope. In the discrete time case, if the planning horizon  is finite, the problem can also be easily solved by dynamic programming.

When the underlying process is determined by a family of (conditional) transition functions leading to a Markov family of transition probabilities, powerful analytical tools provided by the theory of Markov processes can often be utilized and this approach is referred to as the Markov method. The solution is usually obtained by solving the associated free-boundary problems (Stefan problems).

A jump diffusion result 
Let  be a Lévy diffusion in  given by the SDE
  
Let  be an open set (the solvency region) and 
 
be the bankruptcy time. The optimal stopping problem is:
 
It turns out that under some regularity conditions, the following verification theorem holds:

If a function  satisfies
then  for all . Moreover, if
  on 

These conditions can also be written is a more compact form (the integro-variational inequality):
  on

Examples

Coin tossing 
(Example where  converges)

You have a fair coin and are repeatedly tossing it. Each time, before it is tossed, you can choose to stop tossing it and get paid (in dollars, say) the average number of heads observed.

You wish to maximise the amount you get paid by choosing a stopping rule.
If Xi (for i ≥ 1) forms a sequence of independent, identically distributed random variables with Bernoulli distribution
 
and if
 

House selling 
(Example where  does not necessarily converge)

You have a house and wish to sell it. Each day you are offered  for your house, and pay  to continue advertising it. If you sell your house on day , you will earn , where .

You wish to maximise the amount you earn by choosing a stopping rule.

In this example, the sequence is the sequence of offers for your house, and the sequence of reward functions is how much you will earn.

Secretary problem 

(Example where  is a finite sequence)

You are observing a sequence of objects which can be ranked from best to worst. You wish to choose a stopping rule which maximises your chance of picking the best object.

This problem was solved in the early 1960s by several people. An elegant solution to the secretary problem and several modifications of this problem is provided by the more recent odds algorithm of optimal stopping (Bruss algorithm).

Search theory 

Economists have studied a number of optimal stopping problems similar to the 'secretary problem', and typically call this type of analysis 'search theory'. Search theory has especially focused on a worker's search for a high-wage job, or a consumer's search for a low-priced good.

Parking problem 
A special example of an application of search theory is the task of optimal selection of parking space by a driver going to the opera (theater, shopping, etc.). Approaching the destination, the driver goes down the street along which there are parking spaces – usually, only some places in the parking lot are free. The goal is clearly visible, so the distance from the target is easily assessed. The driver's task is to choose a free parking space as close to the destination as possible without turning around so that the distance from this place to the destination is the shortest.

Option trading 
In the trading of options on financial markets, the holder of an American option is allowed to exercise the right to buy (or sell) the underlying asset at a predetermined price at any time before or at the expiry date. Therefore, the valuation of American options is essentially an optimal stopping problem. The stock price  follows geometric Brownian motion
 
under the risk-neutral measure.

When the option is perpetual, the optimal stopping problem is
 
The variational inequality is
 
for all 
where  is the exercise boundary. The solution is known to be
 (Perpetual call)  where  and 
 (Perpetual put)  where  and 

On the other hand, when the expiry date is finite, the problem is associated with a 2-dimensional free-boundary problem with no known closed-form solution. Various numerical methods can, however, be used. See Black–Scholes model#American options for various valuation methods here, as well as Fugit for a discrete, tree based, calculation of the optimal time to exercise.

See also 
 Halting problem
 Markov decision process
 Optional stopping theorem
 Prophet inequality
 Stochastic control

References

Citations

Sources 

 Thomas S. Ferguson, Optimal Stopping and Applications, retrieved on 21 June 2007
 Thomas S. Ferguson, "Who solved the secretary problem?" Statistical Science, Vol. 4.,282–296, (1989)
 F. Thomas Bruss. "Sum the odds to one and stop." Annals of Probability, Vol. 28, 1384–1391,(2000)
 F. Thomas Bruss. "The art of a right decision: Why decision makers want to know the odds-algorithm." Newsletter of the European Mathematical Society, Issue 62, 14–20, (2006)
 

Mathematical finance
Sequential methods
Dynamic programming